Hálfdan Narfason (died 1568), was an Icelandic priest and Galdrmaster. He is known in Icelandic folklore, where he is the subject of many folksagas about his alleged magical performances.

References 
„Galdrameistarinn í íslenzkri þjóðsögu. Lesbók Morgunblaðsins, 10. september 1967.“,
„Frá séra Hálfdani á Felli. Af snerpu.is.“,

1568 deaths
16th-century Icelandic people
Year of birth missing